The Tri-State Music Festival is an annual festival in Enid, Oklahoma since 1932. It is named for the three original participating states, Oklahoma, Kansas, and Texas.

The festival includes a jazz festival, a parade, a grand concert and a carnival. It attracts approximately 8,000 participants and nearly 20,000 performances annually.

History
The annual event began as Phillips Band Day in 1932, drawing bands from Oklahoma, Kansas, and Texas. In 1933, it was renamed the Tri-State Band Festival and eventually became the Tri-State Music Festival and expanded to include additional music groups.

The 2013 festival included a concert and guitar clinic with classical guitarist Edgar Cruz.

Components
The 2012 Tri-State Music Festival included a parade and a Grand Concert at Chisholm Trail Expo Center. The event also includes a Tri-State Dance.

The festival also includes a jazz festival in downtown Enid, Oklahoma and an Ottaway Carnival in Oakwood Mall.

References

Music festivals in Oklahoma
Tourist attractions in Enid, Oklahoma
Enid, Oklahoma